Dracophyllum sinclairii, commonly called gumland grass tree, is a species of plant in the family Ericaceae that is endemic to New Zealand.

References

sinclairii
Flora of the North Island
Endemic flora of New Zealand